Venkat Kumar Gangai Amaren (born 7 November 1975), better known by his stage name Venkat Prabhu, is an Indian filmmaker, actor and playback singer in Tamil films. After completing his education, he began pursuing an acting career, with his first three ventures featuring him in a starring role, failing to release, following which he began appearing in character roles. He entered the spotlight for the first time when he turned director with the summer hit Chennai 600028 (2007). He achieved further commercial successes with his subsequent directorials Saroja (2008), Goa (2010), Mankatha (2011), Biriyani (2013), Masss (2015) and Maanaadu (2021). His father Gangai Amaren is a film director and music director .

Early life and career 
 Following his return to India, Prabhu began singing for demos by his cousins, Yuvan Shankar Raja and Karthik Raja, and started his career as a playback singer in the film industry. In 1996, he, his brother Premgi Amaren and his childhood friend S. P. B. Charan set up a music band called Next Generation, which also featured Yugendran and Thaman as members, and did several stage performances. The following year, Prabhu played the lead role opposite Sangeetha in a film titled Poonjolai directed by his father Gangai Amaren, but the film was cancelled in mid-production and attempts to revive and release the film by the late-2000s were unsuccessful. Prabhu starred in two more ventures, alongside his friends S. P. B. Charan and Yugendran; Wanted, directed by Premgi Amaren, and Agathiyan's Kadhal Samrajyam, both failing to release as well. Venkat Prabhu was then approached to essay supporting roles, with April Maadhathil (2002) becoming his first release. He went on to play character roles in nearly ten films, the most notable ventures being N. Linguswamy's Ji, starring Ajith Kumar, and the Perarasu-directed Sivakasi, featuring Vijay in the lead role. In 2008, he worked in Seeman's Vaazhthugal alongside Madhavan in his last credited appearance to date. He also played lead roles in Samuthirakani's directorial debut Unnai Charanadaindhen and Gnabagam Varuthey (2007), both co-starring Charan.

In 2007, Venkat Prabhu ventured into film directing with the sports comedy film Chennai 600028, produced by S. P. B. Charan, that revolved around a street cricket team from a suburban area in Chennai, with its players being portrayed by 11 newcomers, including his brother Premgi. The film emerged as a sleeper hit, garnering high critical acclaim and becoming labelled a "cult classic" in the following years, which led to the lead cast growing in popularity. He next directed the comedy thriller film Saroja (2008), the title being derived from a hit number from Chennai 600028, which also featured an ensemble cast including Charan and Premgi. The film followed the journey of four young men who, by taking a diversion off the main road, land into the hands of a kidnapper gang; it received positive response from critics and at the box office as well. He followed it up with Goa (2010), a full-length comedy film, which received mixed response and did fairly well at the box office. In 2011, he directed his biggest project to date, the action thriller Mankatha, featuring Ajith Kumar in the lead role and was later a blockbuster.

His next project, Biriyani (2013), starred Karthi and Hansika Motwani. After Venkat Prabhu directed Massu Engira Masilamani, with Suriya and Nayanthara in the lead role.

He directed Chennai 600028 II, the sequel of the 2007 blockbuster Chennai 600028, and it was released on 9 December 2016 to positive reviews.

Personal life 
Venkat Prabhu is the son of director-turned-music-director Gangai Amaran and elder brother to actor, singer and music director Premgi Amaran. His uncle is the music director Ilayaraaja and his cousins are the music composers Yuvan Shankar Raja, Karthik Raja and singer Bhavatharini. S. P. B. Charan, producer of Prabhu's first directorial venture Chennai 600028, is his very close friend and they both have worked together on several projects.

He did his schooling at St. Bede's school in Chennai. On 10 September 2001, Venkat Prabhu married Rajalakshmi, the daughter of dance teacher K. J. Sarasa, and now has a daughter named Shivani. Shivani has already sung a song for the album Thaaaii when she was 5 years old.

Frequent collaborators 
Venkat Prabhu frequently works with the same actors and crew members, most prominently Premji, composer Yuvan and editor Praveen.

Filmography

As director and producer

As an actor

As singer

As lyricist

Productions

Television 
 Idho Boopalaam
 Kundakka Mandakka
 Thedathey Tholaindhu Povai
 Kollywood Kings

References

External links 

 

Male actors from Chennai
Living people
Male actors in Tamil cinema
Tamil male actors
Tamil film directors
Alumni of Middlesex University
1975 births
Tamil screenwriters
Tamil playback singers
Singers from Chennai
Film directors from Chennai
21st-century Indian film directors
Indian male playback singers
21st-century Indian singers
21st-century Indian male actors
21st-century Indian male singers